Epaulette Mountain is a  mountain summit in Alberta, Canada.

Description

Epaulette Mountain is located in Banff National Park and is visible from the Icefields Parkway. It is part of the Waputik Mountains, a subrange of the Canadian Rockies. The nearest higher peak is Mount Sarbach,  to the northwest. Epaulette Mountain is situated south of Saskatchewan Crossing, where the Icefields Parkway intersects with the David Thompson Highway. Precipitation runoff from Epaulette Mountain drains east into the Mistaya River and west into Howse River, which are both tributaries of the North Saskatchewan River. Topographic relief is significant as the summit rises 1,600 meters (5,250 feet) above the Howse Valley in three kilometers (1.9 miles), and 1,400 meters (4,593 feet) above the Mistaya Valley in three kilometers.

History

The first ascent of Epaulette Mountain was made in 1924 by Frederick Vanderbilt Field, William Osgood Field, and guide Edward Feuz Jr. The mountain's toponym was officially adopted June 7, 1961, by the Geographical Names Board of Canada. The descriptive name refers to the shoulder ornament on some military uniforms, and how a glacier seems to hang on a narrow shelf above the steep cliffs, thought to resemble an epaulette. Epaulette is a French word which means "little shoulders" (epaule, referring to "shoulder").

Geology

Like other mountains in Banff Park, the Epaulette Mountain is composed of sedimentary rock laid down during the Precambrian to Jurassic periods. Formed in shallow seas, this sedimentary rock was pushed east and over the top of younger rock during the Laramide orogeny.

Climate

Based on the Köppen climate classification, Epaulette Mountain is located in a subarctic climate zone with cold, snowy winters, and mild summers. Winter temperatures can drop below -20 °C with wind chill factors below -30 °C.

See also
 
 Geography of Alberta
 Geology of the Rocky Mountains

Gallery

References

External links
 Weather forecast: Epaulette Mountain
 Parks Canada web site: Banff National Park

Three-thousanders of Alberta
Mountains of Banff National Park
Canadian Rockies
Alberta's Rockies